Morgan McDonald (born 23 April 1996) is an Australian distance runner. McDonald competed at the Tokyo 2020 Olympics coming 11th in Heat 2 of the qualifying rounds in the Men's 5000m with a time of 13:37.36.

McDonald competed in the Men's 5000 metres at the Tokyo Olympics, 2017 World Championships in Athletics and 2019 World Championships in Athletics. McDonald competed in 2018 Commonwealth Games placed 8th in 5000 meters in 14:11.37. McDonald is a 4-time NCAA Champion, 8-time NCAA Division I All-American and 8-time Big Ten Conference champion. McDonald placed 7th at 10 km in 29:59.2 at the 2016 NCAA Division I Cross Country Championships and placed 1st in the 10 km in 29:08.3 at the 2018 NCAA Division I Cross Country Championships.

Early life
McDonald attended Newington College in Sydney, Australia, completing his schooling in 2013. He was a key member in Newington's 2011 GPS Senior Cross Country and 2012 Senior Athletics premierships. He won Newington's A.D.G. Stewart Trophy for 3000m running.

In addition to his athletic achievements at Newington, Morgan excelled in the classroom. He finished with an ATAR of 98.95, achieving a Band 6 (>90% raw mark) in three subjects: Ancient History, English Extension 1 and Physics.

Career
In July 2019, McDonald signed with Under Armour. In June 2021, McDonald left Under Armour and his coach Joe Bosshard to sign with On Athletics Club under coach Dathan Ritzenhein.

NCAA
McDonald is a 4-time NCAA Champion, 8-time NCAA Division 1 All-American Wisconsin Badger distance runner.
Morgan McDonald won 10 km in 29:08.3 at the 2018 NCAA Division I Cross Country Championships leading the Wisconsin Badgers men's cross country to an 8th-place team finish.

Prep
McDonald won the 2007 Australian U12 National Cross Country Championship.

McDonald won the 2009 Australian U14 National Cross Country Championship.

McDonald won the 2011 Australian U16 National Cross Country Championship.

McDonald was the 2012 U18 Australian National 3000 meters Champion.

McDonald won the 2012 Australian U18 National Cross Country Championship.

McDonald won the 2013 Australian U18 National Cross Country Championship.

McDonald represented Australia in the 2013 World Junior Cross Country Championship in the U20 division at the age of 16 in Bydgoszcz, Poland and again in 2015 in Guiyang, China at the age of 18.

McDonald ran in the 2014 Australian Nationals in the 5000 meters for the U20 division.

McDonald won the 2018 Australian National 5000m in 2018, in a time of 13.19.05 (a record for the National championship).

McDonald competed and finished 10th in the 5000 meters in the U20 division at the 2014 World Junior Athletics Championships in Hayward Field, Eugene.

References

External links

Morgan McDonald at University of Wisconsin

1996 births
Living people
World Athletics Championships athletes for Australia
People educated at Newington College
Athletes from Sydney
Australian male long-distance runners
Wisconsin Badgers men's track and field athletes
University of Wisconsin–Madison alumni
Athletes (track and field) at the 2018 Commonwealth Games
Commonwealth Games competitors for Australia
Athletes (track and field) at the 2020 Summer Olympics
Olympic athletes of Australia